Kevin Smith: Burn In Hell is the fifth installment of Kevin Smith's Q&A series and was broadcast on Epix on February 11, 2012.

The special was filmed after a showing of Smith's film Red State at the Paramount Theatre in Austin, Texas, where he answers questions on the making of the film and dealing with the Westboro Baptist Church.

Reception
"Burn in Hell, the fifth installment in the Q&A specials, left me feeling absolutely awe-struck by the deep reverence for life and art and genuinely sage wisdom Smith possesses and shares with his loyal fans."

References

External links

American documentary films
Documentary films about film directors and producers
Works by Kevin Smith
SModcast Pictures films